This is a list of films produced by the Tollywood (Telugu language film industry) based in Hyderabad in 1993.

List of released films

Highest Grossing Films

Dubbed films

References

1993
Telugu
 Telugu films
1993 in Indian cinema